Brainpower is a Dutch musician.

Brainpower, BrainPower, or Brain Power may also refer to:

Music
 Brainpower (song), a song by Freezepop 
 "Brain Power", a song by Paul Engemann
 "Brain Power", an electronic song by NOMA first featured in SOUND VOLTEX II -infinite infection-, whose lyrics became a meme

Television
 "Brain Power", an episode of the television series Baby Felix
 "Brainpower", an episode of the television series Human Body: Pushing the Limits
 "Brain Power", an episode of the television series In Search Of
 "Brain Power", an episode of the television series The Human Body
 "Brain Power", an episode of the television series Zoboomafoo

Other uses
 Brainpower, Inc., a faith-based organization in the Center for Bronx Non-Profits
 Brain Power, a video game for the console Watara Supervision
 Brain Power, a book following the animated television series Dexter's Laboratory

See also
 Brain Powerd, a Japanese anime television series